The following is a list of Interstate highways in the U.S. state of Nevada. All active mainline Interstates are maintained by the Nevada Department of Transportation, except for a portion of Interstate 215. Interstate business loops are only state-maintained where they overlap with an active State Route or U.S. route.


Main routes

Business routes

See also

List of U.S. Routes in Nevada
List of state routes in Nevada

References

External links

Nevada Highways @ AARoads
Nevada Department of Transportation

 
Interstate